Fever is an increase in internal body temperature to levels above normal.

Fever or The Fever may also refer to:

Film
 Fever (1981 film), a Polish film
 Fever (1989 film), an Australian-American erotic thriller/comedy
 Fever (1991 film), an American television film starring Armand Assante
 Fever (1999 film), a film directed by Alex Winter
 Fever (2014 film), an Austrian film
 Fever (2016 film), a Bollywood film
 The Fever (2004 film), an adaptation of Wallace Shawn's play (see below)
 The Fever (2005 film), an Italian film by Alessandro D'Alatri
 The Fever (2019 film), a Brazilian film by Maya Da-Rin
 Fedz (working title Fever), a 2013 British crime thriller by Q

Literature

Novels
 Fever (Thwaites novel), a 1939 novel by F.J. Thwaites
 Fever (Cook novel), a 1982 novel by Robin Cook
 Fever (DeStafano novel), a 2013 novel by Lauren DeStefano
 Fever, a 2013 novel by Mary Beth Keane
 Fever, a 2016 novel by Deon Meyer
 The Fever (novel), a 2014 novel by Megan Abbott

Other
 A Fever, a poem by John Donne
 Fever (comics), several comics characters or publications, including:
 Fever, a DC Comics character in the Doom Patrol
 Fever, a Marvel Comics character in Doom 2099 comics
 Fever Zine, a UK quarterly
 The Fever, a 1990 play by Wallace Shawn, basis for the 2004 film

Music

Performers and labels
 Fever (band), an American disco trio
 The Fever (band), an American rock band
 The Fevers, a Brazilian rock band
 Fever Records, an American record label

Albums
 Fever (Black Milk album), 2018
 Fever (Bullet for My Valentine album) or the title song (see below), 2010
 Fever (Kylie Minogue album) or the title song, 2001
 Fever (Ronnie Laws album), 1976
 Fever (Roy Ayers album) or the title song, 1979
 Fever (Sodagreen album) or the title song, 2009
 Fever (mixtape), by Megan Thee Stallion, 2019
 Fever: Legend Live, by Kumi Koda, 2014
 Fever or the title song, by Annabella Lwin, 1986
 Fever, by Balthazar, 2019
 Fever, by Con Funk Shun, 1983
 Fever, by Sleepy Sun, 2010
 Fever or the title song (see below), by Little Willie John, 1955
 Fever or the title song, an EP by Quentin Elias, 2008

Songs
 "Fever" (Adam Lambert song), 2010
 "Fever" (Aerosmith song), 1993; covered as "The Fever" by Garth Brooks (1995)
 "Fever" (B.Traits song), 2012
 "Fever" (The Black Keys song), 2014
 "Fever" (Bullet for My Valentine song), 2011
 "Fever" (Cascada song), 2009
 "Fever" (Dua Lipa and Angèle song), 2020
 "Fever" (GFriend song), 2019
 "Fever" (Little Willie John song), 1956; covered by Peggy Lee (1958),  Madonna (1993), Beyoncé (2010), and many others
 "Fever" (Starsailor song), 2001
 "Fever" (Tone Damli song), 2007
 "The Fever" (Bruce Springsteen song), 1999
"Fever", by B'z from The Circle, 2005
 "Fever", by Bulldog Mansion from Bulldog Mansion, 2000
 "Fever", by Buono! from Sherbet, 2012
 "Fever", by Carly Rae Jepsen from Emotion: Side B, 2016
 "Fever", by Dongkiz, 2019
 "Fever", by Enhypen, 2021
 "Fever", by Family Force 5 from Dance or Die, 2008
 "Fever", by HALO, 2014
 "Fever", by the Hives from A.K.A. I-D-I-O-T, 1998
 "Fever", by Inna from Hot, 2009
 "Fever", by J. Y. Park, 2019
 "Fever", by Judas Priest from Screaming for Vengeance, 1982
 "Fever", by Kings of Convenience from Peace or Love, 2021
 "Fever", by Klinik, 1989
 "Fever", by Love and Rockets from Sweet F.A., 1996
 "Fever", by Neko Case from Middle Cyclone, 2009
 "Fever", by Oscar and the Wolf, 2018
 "Fever", by the Osmonds from Love Me for a Reason, 1974
 "Fever", by Preoccupations from Preoccupations, 2016
 "Fever", by Two Door Cinema Club from Gameshow, 2016
 "The Fever", by The Academy Is... from From the Carpet, 2006
 "The Fever (Aye Aye)", by Death Grips from The Money Store, 2012

Television and radio
 The Fever, a 2019 television series starring Jarry Lee
 Fever 104 FM, a radio channel in India

Episodes
 "Fever" (Black Books)
 "Fever" (Moonlight)
 "Fever" (Queen of Swords)
 "Fever" (Sliders)
 "Fever" (Smallville)
 "The Fever" (Pose)
 "The Fever" (The Twilight Zone)

Sports
 Indiana Fever, a Women's National Basketball Association team
 West Coast Fever, an Australian netball team

See also

 Fever Fever (disambiguation)
 Feaver, a surname
 
 Feve (disambiguation)
 FEV (disambiguation)